Wiesenfeld may refer to:

Place name
 Wiesenfeld, Eichsfeld, a municipality in the Eichsfeld district, Thuringia, Germany
 Wiesenfeld, part of Geisa in the Wartburg district, Thuringia, Germany
 Wiesenfeld (Karlstadt), a Franconian wine town in Germany

Other uses
 Kurt Wiesenfeld, American physicist and academic
 Weinberger v. Wiesenfeld, a 1976 United States Supreme Court case dealing with equal protection

See also 
 
 Wiesenfelden
 Wiedenfeld (disambiguation)